Back to the Farm is a lost 1914 silent comedy short film that co-starred Oliver "Babe" Hardy and Herbert "Bert" Tracy. Written by Will Louis and produced by the Lubin Manufacturing Company of Pennsylvania, the short was filmed in Jacksonville, Florida. It was directed by Joseph Levering, likely in collaboration with the chief director on Lubin's production staff in Jacksonville, Arthur Hotaling.

Plot

Cast
Babe Hardy (Oliver Hardy) as Tom
Herbert Tracy as Bob 
Roy Byron as Mr. Cassett
Eloise Willard as Auntie
Mabel Paige as Mrs. Cassett

Release and reception
In its review of the comedy after its release in August 1914, the New York-based trade journal Motion Picture News judged it to be very funny. The publication also described the disarming effect that the main characters' childish, dim-witted personalities had on some potentially objectionable or bawdy scenes:

See also
 List of American films of 1914
 Oliver Hardy filmography

References

External links

1914 films
1914 comedy films
1914 short films
American silent short films
Silent American comedy films
American black-and-white films
American comedy short films
Films directed by Joseph Levering
Films directed by Arthur Hotaling
1910s American films
1910s English-language films